
In basketball, a block (short for blocked shot) occurs when a defender deflects or stops a field goal attempt without committing a foul. The top 25 highest blocks totals in NCAA Division I men's basketball history are listed below. The NCAA did not split into its current divisions format until August 1973. From 1906 to 1955, there were no classifications to the NCAA nor its predecessor, the Intercollegiate Athletic Association of the United States (IAAUS). Then, from 1956 to spring 1973, colleges were classified as either "NCAA University Division (Major College)" or "NCAA College Division (Small College)". Blocks are a relatively new statistic in college basketball, having only become an official statistic beginning with the 1985–86 season.

Many well-known players, such as Hall of Famers Ralph Sampson, David Robinson and Hakeem Olajuwon accumulated college block totals that would have placed them in the top 25 all-time if they had not played before blocks were a recognized statistic. Olajuwon played for Houston and accumulated 454 blocks in his three-year career. Robinson, meanwhile, evenly split his four-year career at Navy between the pre-block and the recognized-block statistical eras. For his entire college career, Robinson recorded 516 blocks, but since only his junior and senior seasons' block totals are officially recognized, his two-year sum of 351 blocks does not even rank in the top 25 all-time. Jarvis Varnado of Mississippi State, therefore, holds the Division I record for career blocks with 564. He played for the Bulldogs from 2006–07 through 2009–10 and surpassed Wojciech Myrda's mark of 535 during his senior season. Although Varnado ended with 29 more blocks than Myrda, it took him 26 more games—nearly the amount of a complete season—to finish with that total.

Two of the top eight shot blockers played college basketball for only three seasons. Adonal Foyle of Colgate recorded 492 blocks in just 87 career games before he left one season early for the National Basketball Association (NBA). Foyle would get drafted 8th overall by the Golden State Warriors in the 1997 NBA draft. Meanwhile, Shawn James played in 83 games while registering 443 blocks. James played for two seasons at Northeastern before transferring to Duquesne for one season. At the conclusion of his junior year in 2007–08, James hired an agent after declaring himself eligible for the 2008 draft, thereby forgoing his final season of NCAA eligibility. He was never drafted.

Two schools on this list have two players represented. UConn's Emeka Okafor and Hasheem Thabeet each played three years for the Huskies before also declaring themselves for the NBA Draft. Northwestern State's D'or Fischer and William Mosley are both on this list, but Fischer only played for two seasons at Northwestern State before transferring to West Virginia.

Key

Top 25 career blocks leaders

References
General

Specific

NCAA Division I men's basketball statistical leaders